Libacao, officially the Municipality of Libacao (Aklanon: Banwa it Libacao; Hiligaynon: Banwa sang Libacao), is a 3rd class municipality in the province of Aklan, Philippines. According to the 2020 census, it has a population of 28,272 people.

In 1948, the arrabal of Madalag was separated from Libacao and constituted as a separate town, with the following barrios: Logohon, Singay, Balactasan, Cabangahan, Cabilawan, Pangitan, San Jose, Talimagao, Talangban, Alaminos, Catabana, Bakyang, Calicia, Mercedes, Maria Cristina, Dit-ana, Guinato-an, Tigbauan, Alas-as, Mamba, Medina, Panikyason, and Paningayan.

Geography

According to the Philippine Statistics Authority, the municipality has a land area of  constituting  of the  total area of Aklan.

Climate

Barangays
Libacao is politically subdivided into 24 barangays.

Demographics

In the 2020 census, Libacao had a population of 28,272.

Economy

Tourism
 Nasuraan Falls and Kaeabnakan Falls — located in the remote barangay of Oyang.
 Taroytoy — eyed to be the Summer Capital of Central Philippines.
 Philippine Spotted Deer — a nocturnal and endangered species of deer located primarily in the rainforests of the Visayan islands of Panay and Negros though it once roamed other islands such as Cebu, Guimaras, Leyte, Masbate, and Samar.
 Libacao Wild River — longest Wild River in the Philippines.

Products
 Coconut - Libacao has a lot of mountains and plains which are suitable for coconuts. 
 Abaca - Abaca fiber is also another product that Libacaonons produce.

References

External links

 [ Philippine Standard Geographic Code]

Municipalities of Aklan